Wisconsin is a statue on top of the Wisconsin Capitol Building created by Daniel Chester French.

History
The Wisconsin statue on the dome was sculpted during 1913-1914 by Daniel Chester French of New York City. His model was Audrey Munson.

The statue of a woman on top of the Capitol dome is named "Wisconsin," though it is often misidentified as "Forward" (another statue depicting a woman, a replica of which was on the Capitol grounds at the top of State Street). Perhaps that's because, according to the Wisconsin Historical Society, the statue was “placed on the Capitol dome as a symbol of the state’s motto, ‘Forward’” and to represent “the spirit of Wisconsin progress.” The statue was sculpted by Daniel Chester French, who also created the Abraham Lincoln statue for the Lincoln Memorial. "Wisconsin" looks toward Lake Monona with her right hand outstretched, while her left hand cradles a globe with an eagle perched on it. On top of her helmet are clusters of grapes and the state animal, the badger. French sculpted the 15 foot, five inch, more than three-ton statue in 1914 for a cost of $20,325. The statue is 23 1/2 karat gold-gilded bronze.

Description
This work, Wisconsin, consists of an allegorical figure reminiscent of Athena, dressed in Greek garb, her right arm outstretched to symbolize the state motto, "Forward", and wearing a helmet topped by a badger, the Wisconsin state animal.
The figure's left hand holds a globe with an eagle perched on top.

The lady is also in a mural in the Wisconsin House of Representatives.

References

1914 sculptures
Culture of Madison, Wisconsin
Outdoor sculptures in Wisconsin
Personifications of country subdivisions
Sculptures by Daniel Chester French
Sculptures of birds in the United States
Mammals in art
Finial figures
Allegorical sculptures in the United States